Southern Region (lit: Southern Land) is a region of Iceland. The population of the region was 28,399 (1 January 2020). The largest town in the region is Selfoss, with a population of 6,000.

See also 
 Regions of Iceland

External links 

Source
Iceland on the Web